Psychoplastogens  are a group of small molecule drugs that produce rapid and sustained effects on neuronal structure and function, intended to  manifest therapeutic benefit after a single administration. Several existing psychoplastogens have been identified and their therapeutic effects demonstrated; several are presently at various stages of development as medications including Ketamine, MDMA, Scopolamine, and the serotonergic psychedelics, including LSD, psilocin – the active metabolite of psilocybin, DMT, and 5-MeO-DMT. Compounds of this sort are being explored as therapeutics for a variety of brain disorders including depression, addiction, and PTSD. The ability to rapidly promote neuronal changes via mechanisms of neuroplasticity was recently discovered as the common therapeutic activity and mechanism of action.

Etymology and nomenclature 

The term psychoplastogen comes from the Greek roots - (mind), - (molded), and - (producing) and covers a variety of chemotypes and receptor targets. It was coined by David E. Olson in collaboration with Valentina Popescu, both at the University of California, Davis.

The term neuroplastogen is sometimes used as a synonym for psychoplastogen, especially when speaking to the biological substrate rather than the therapeutic.

Chemistry 

Psychoplastogens come in a variety of chemotypes but, by definition, are small molecules.

Pharmacology 

Psychoplastogens exert their effects by promoting structural and functional neural plasticity through diverse targets including, but not limited to, 5-HT2A, NMDA, and muscarinic receptors. Some are biased agonists. While each compound may have a different receptor binding profile, signaling appears to converge at the tyrosine kinase B (TrkB) and mammalian target of rapamycin (mTOR) pathways.

Due to their rapid and sustained effects, psychoplastogens could potentially be dosed intermittently.

In addition to the neuroplasticity effects, these compounds can have other epiphenomena including sedation, dissociation, and hallucinations.

Approved medical uses 

Several psychoplastogens have either been approved or are in development for the treatment of a variety of brain disorders associated with neuronal atrophy where neuroplasticity can elicit beneficial effects.

Esketamine, sold under the brand name Spravato and produced by Janssen Pharmaceuticals, was approved by the FDA in March 2019 for the treatment of Treatment-Resistant Depression (TRD) and suicidal ideation. As of 2022, it  is the only psychoplastogen approved in the US for the treatment of a neuropsychiatric disorder. Esketamine is the S(+) enantiomer of ketamine and functions as an NMDA receptor antagonist.

Clinical development 

Other psychoplastogens that are being investigated in the clinic include:
 Rapastinel, a compound that enhances NMDAR-mediated neural plasticity, has been investigated for treatment of depression. As of 2015, the drug has achieved phase II proof of concept as a rapid-acting antidepressant without eliciting ketamine-like psychotomimetic or other significant side effects.
 MDMA-assisted psychotherapy is being investigated for treatment of PTSD. A recent placebo controlled Phase 3 trial found that 67% of participants in the MDMA+therapy group no longer met the diagnostic criteria for PTSD whereas 32% of those in the placebo+therapy group no longer met PTSD threshold. MDMA-assisted psychotherapy is also currently in Phase 2 trials for eating disorders, anxiety associated with life-threatening illness, and social anxiety in autistic adults.
 Psilocybin, a compound in psilocybin mushrooms that serves as a prodrug for psilocin, is currently being investigated in clinical trials of Hallucinogen-Assisted Therapy for a variety of neuropsychiatric disorders. To date studies have explored the utility of psilocybin in a variety of diseases, including TRD, smoking addiction, and anxiety and depression in people with cancer diagnoses.
 LSD is being tested in phase 2 trials for cluster headaches and anxiety.
 DMT is being studied for depression and stroke.
 5-MeO-DMT is being studied for depression and eating disorders.
 Ibogaine and Noribogaine are being studied for addiction.

List of known psychoplastogens 
 Tryptamines: Psilocin, DMT, 5-MeO-DMT
 Lysergamides: LSD
 Amphetamines: DOI, MDMA
 Iboga: Ibogaine, Noribogaine
 Tabernanthalog
 AAZ-A-154
 Ketamine
 Scopolamine
 Rapastinel

See also 

 Ayahuasca#Neurogenesis
 Banisteriopsis caapi#Neurogenesis
 Neuroplasticity
 Ketamine
 Psilocybin
 LSD
 DMT
 TBG
 AAZ

References 

Neuropharmacology